Hypogymnia papilliformis is a rare species of foliose lichen in the family Parmeliaceae. Found in China and the Russian Far East, it was formally described as a new species in 2015 by Bruce McCune, Svetlana Tchabanenko, and Xin Li Wei. The specific epithet papilliformis alludes to the papillose texture (i.e., covered with pimple-like structures) of the upper thallus surface. Secondary compounds that occur in Hypogymnia papilliformis include atranorin, and physodic acid as major metabolites, and minor amounts of 2'-O-methylphysodic acid and vittatolic acid.

References

papilliformis
Lichen species
Lichens described in 2015
Lichens of China
Lichens of the Russian Far East
Taxa named by Bruce McCune